Fort Valley is a census-designated place in the southern portion of Coconino County in the state of Arizona, United States.  Fort Valley  is located very close to the city of Flagstaff.  The population as of 2010, was 779.

Demographics

History 
Fort Valley is a historical settlement at the base of Mt. Agassiz in Flagstaff, Arizona. It gained its name as a fort that was established to defend against Apache tribes although it was never actually used. Wagon trains migrating from the east came upon Flagstaff and settled here. Many of the old settlements can still be seen today. The primary motivation for this settlement was logging as was true for the rest of Flagstaff. The ponderosa pine forest supplied abundant amounts of timber which were then transported via railroad.

The first Fort Valley settlers were Laura and William Murphy in 1881, they belonged to the church of Jesus Christ of Latter Day Saints. After these first settlers many more followed. Eventually a small community was developed and Fort Valley became a ranching hub in northern Arizona. As ranching took hold in Fort Valley the effect on the environment was devastating. Water sources such as Leroux spring ran dark with silt and the land was becoming a victim of overgrazing. In 1908 Gustaf Adolf Pearson arrived in Fort Valley as a member of the forest service and began to revive the area.

Fort Valley was also a popular hub for the scientific community to collect data on recently obtained land in the Southwest. Because of the unique combination of a desert and a mountain environment the area was particularly interesting for geologists, paleontologists, and scientists alike.

Present 
Fort Valley remains a settlement today. The suburb of Flagstaff Arizona still holds a number of small farms and ranches. The Leroux spring has been taken over by the city of Flagstaff and the city is considering it as a potential water source. Fort Valley remains a wide open meadow at the base of what is now Snowbowl Road. Much of the past wildlife such as deer, herons, and elk remain in the area.

Climate
According to the Köppen Climate Classification system, Fort Valley has a dry-summer humid continental climate, abbreviated "Dsb" on climate maps.

References

Further reading

External links

Census-designated places in Coconino County, Arizona
Census-designated places in Arizona